Only the 1st, 2nd, 4th, and Ivanovic/Kirilenko made it into the semifinals, with the 4th and 2nd seeds respectively getting eliminated in three sets. The 4th seed team going down to the 1st seed team, 46 63 61, while the 2nd seed team, going down to Ivanovic and Kirilenko, 63 26 62. The 3rd seeded team went down to Ivanovic and Kirilenko in straight sets, in the first round. Yan Zi and Zheng Jie emerged as the champions, beating Serbian Ana Ivanovic and Russian Maria Kirilenko in three sets.

Seeds

  Yan Zi Zheng Jie (champions)
  Elena Dementieva Flavia Pennetta (semifinals)
  Eleni Daniilidou Anabel Medina Garrigues (first round)
  Maria Elena Camerin Gisela Dulko (semifinals)

Draw

Draw

References

Ordina Open
Rosmalen Grass Court Championships